Mise Éire (Irish for "I [am] Ireland") is a 1912 Irish-language poem by the Irish poet and Republican revolutionary leader Patrick Pearse.

Background 
Mise Éire is a 1912 Irish-language poem by the Irish poet and Republican revolutionary leader Patrick Pearse.

Political relevance 
In the poem, Pearse personifies Ireland as an old woman whose glory is past and who has been sold by her children.

Later use 

Described as both a literary and historical text, it was regularly used by Republican prisoners in Long Kesh as a means of learning and teaching Irish. Is Mise continues to be relevant in post-partition Ireland, suggest scholars, as illustrating of the difficulties in identifying "Irishness" in Northern Ireland.

Counter view
The title of the poem was used as a title for a 1959 documentary film by George Morrison, which dealt with key figures and events in Irish Nationalism between the 1890s and the 1910s, including Pearse himself.

A poem of the same name by Eavan Boland was written as a counter to Pearse's poem, and its treatment of Ireland and her children. Pearse had already written optimistically on the fate of Ireland's strong sons' martyrdom in his poem "The Mother"; Is Mise takes the opposite, more pessimistic view of the sacrifice. In the words of Boss, Nordin and Orlinder, Boland "opposes and corrects Pearse's view on Ireland...No longer, as in the earlier poem, is the personification of the country 'older than the Old Woman of Beare' but 'a sloven’s mix'. The glory of having born 'Cuchulain 
the valiant’ is turned into the picture of the woman ‘holding her half-dead baby to her'.

Cultural usage

In 2016, the poem was set to music composed by Patrick Cassidy and performed by the RTÉ Concert Orchestra with vocals by Sibéal Ní Chasaide, for the score of the PBS documentary series 1916: An Irish Rebellion, curated by the Keough-Naughton Institute for Irish Studies at the University of Notre Dame.

In 2021, the song was recorded and released as a single by the Irish all female group Celtic Woman as part of their upcoming album, Postcards from Ireland.

The text
Irish (direct translation)

Notes

References

External links

Irish poetry
Irish language
Personifications of Ireland